Lei Donghui (born May 5, 1984 in Beijing) is a female Chinese softball player. She was part of the fourth-placed team at the 2003 Junior World Championship.

She also competed for Team China at the 2008 Summer Olympics in Beijing.

See also
 Softball at the 2008 Summer Olympics

References
Profile

1984 births
Living people
Chinese softball players
Olympic softball players of China
Sportspeople from Beijing
Softball players at the 2004 Summer Olympics
Softball players at the 2008 Summer Olympics
21st-century Chinese women